Kirk Zavieh (born 1 April 1968) is a British fencer. He competed in the individual and team sabre events at the 1992 Summer Olympics.

He is also the composer, alongside Charles Hodgkinson, of the Sky News music theme, performed by the Royal Philharmonic Orchestra.

References

External links
 

1968 births
Living people
British male fencers
Olympic fencers of Great Britain
Fencers at the 1992 Summer Olympics
Sportspeople from Port of Spain